Zou Wenzhi (born 1914, date of death unknown) was a Chinese footballer. He competed in the men's tournament at the 1948 Summer Olympics.

References

External links
 

1914 births
Year of death missing
Chinese footballers
China international footballers
Olympic footballers of China
Footballers at the 1948 Summer Olympics
1960 AFC Asian Cup players
Association football midfielders